The marsh antwren (Formicivora acutirostris), also known as the Paraná antwren, is an insectivorous bird in the antbird family Thamnophilidae. It is endemic to marshes and swamps in the Brazilian states of Paraná and Santa Catarina.

It was first described in 1995. Although initially placed in its own genus Stymphalornis, a subsequently molecular phylogenetic study has shown that the marsh antwren is closely related to species in the genus Formicivora.

It is threatened by habitat loss and currently considered Endangered by BirdLife International.

Two subspecies are recognised:
 F. a. acutirostris Bornschein, Reinert & Teixera, 1995 – Paraná to northeast Rio Grande do Sul
 F. a. paludicola (Buzzetti et al., 2013) – east São Paulo

The subspecies F. a. paludicola was discovered near São Paulo and described in 2013 as a new species in the genus Formicivora. This subspecies has been found in fifteen small, isolated areas in the east of the state of São Paulo, not far from the city of São Paulo, in south-eastern Brazil. There it inhabits marshes with relatively tall vegetation. Much of its habitat is degraded and threatened by agricultural, industrial and residential development.

Males of the subspecies F. a. paludicola can be distinguished from those of the nominate subspecies by their black underparts and thighs, very dark grey-brown upperparts, and a smaller exposed culmen. Females are distinguished by their very dark grey-brown upperparts and flanks, and smaller exposed culmen.

The fourth edition of the Howard and Moore Complete Checklist of the Birds of the World and the online edition of the Handbook of the Birds of the World both treat the two subspecies as separate species and place them in the genus Formicivora. In their treatment Formicivora acutirostris is given the English name "Parana antwren" and Formicivora paludicola the name "marsh antwren".

The suspended cup-shaped nest is made of dry vegetation. The clutch is two white eggs which have irregular brown blotches.

References

External links

BirdLife Species Factsheet.

marsh antwren
Birds of the Atlantic Forest
Endemic birds of Brazil
marsh antwren
Taxonomy articles created by Polbot